Mauricio Leonicio Soto (born 22 February 1986) is an Argentine professional footballer who plays as a midfielder.

Career
Soto began his career in senior football with hometown club Berazategui. He featured twenty-four times throughout the 2007–08 campaign in Primera D Metropolitana, netting four goals as they won promotion to Primera C Metropolitana. One goal in thirteen games followed. In 2009, Soto had loan spells away with Liniers and Deportivo Riestra. Four total goals arrived, prior to Soto returning to Berazategui. Months later, fellow Primera D Metropolitana team San Martín signed Soto. Sixteen goals in seventy-nine fixtures came in three years. Across 2013 and 2014, Soto had stints with Sacachispas and Juventud Unida.

Soto rejoined Deportivo Riestra on 30 June 2014, with the club now in Primera C Metropolitana. They won promotion to Primera B Metropolitana in his first season, with the player netting goals against Deportivo Morón and Almagro in the succeeding campaign. Overall, Soto participated in ninety-one matches at that level across 2015, 2016 and 2016–17. After they were promoted in the latter, Soto featured twenty-two times in the 2017–18 Primera B Nacional as they suffered relegation.

Career statistics
.

References

External links

1986 births
Living people
People from Berazategui Partido
Argentine footballers
Association football midfielders
Primera D Metropolitana players
Primera C Metropolitana players
Primera B Metropolitana players
Primera Nacional players
A.D. Berazategui footballers
Club Social y Deportivo Liniers players
Deportivo Riestra players
San Martín de Burzaco footballers
Sacachispas Fútbol Club players
Juventud Unida de San Miguel players
Sportspeople from Buenos Aires Province